James McMullen (born June 12, 1939) is an American rower. He competed in the men's coxed four event at the 1956 Summer Olympics.

References

External links
 

1939 births
Living people
American male rowers
Olympic rowers of the United States
Rowers at the 1956 Summer Olympics
Rowers from Buffalo, New York